Elizabeth Maree Tomkins (born 1 December 1982) is an Australian film producer.

She studied at Queensland College of Art, graduating in 2005, and later began work at Briz 31 Community Television, where among other roles she produced the station's flagship show Cinema. She subsequently left community television to pursue work on various films and TV series shot in Canada, South-East Queensland, and Far-North Queensland by companies including HBO, FOX, Dimeworth Films, and Limelight International.

By 2009, she changed course to pursue independent producing and began as Production Manager and publicist of a low-budget thriller Sleeper.  The film was developed by Brisbane-based production company Seven8 Media  and was distributed in North America and Canada by Celebrity Home Entertainment.

This would lead to her producing Screen Development Australia funded short film Tender which she developed with its Queensland branch QPIX.

In 2012 Liz Tomkins and Judd Tilyard produced the short film Frame 137  which Tilyard also wrote and directed. The film is based on the comic of the same name crafted by The Crow creator James O'Barr  and the sound track features a collaboration of Iggy Pop's Dog Food by Dave Grohl and Nick Oliveri.  Other contributors to the sound track Norwegian punk rock musician Happy Tom and The Dwarves lead guitarist Marc Diamond.

Filmography

Feature Film 
 Sleeper (2009 film) Production Manager

TV Series 
 Hoax (2014) Producer
 Cinema (2006) Producer

Short Film 
 Frame 137 (2012) Producer  
 Tender (2012) Producer

References

External links 
 Official Site
 Youtube
 Twitter

1982 births
Living people
Griffith University alumni
Australian film producers
People from Brisbane